Frederick Moyer (born December 12, 1957) is an American concert pianist.

Biography
Moyer first appeared with the Boston Symphony at age 14, performed with The Boston Pops as a teenager, and made his Carnegie Recital Hall debut in 1982. He attended the Curtis Institute of Music in Philadelphia while in high school, and graduated from Indiana University.

Moyer has appeared as piano soloist with orchestras including the Cleveland, Philadelphia and Minnesota Orchestras, the St. Louis, Dallas, Indianapolis, Milwaukee, Baltimore, Pittsburgh, Houston, Singapore, Netherlands Radio, Latvian, Iceland and London Symphony Orchestras, the Buffalo, Hong Kong and Japan Philharmonic Symphony Orchestras, the National Symphony Orchestra of Brazil, and the major orchestras of Australia.  His 25 recordings on the JRI Recordings label include the works of more than 30 composers.  Composers who have written for him include Louis Calabro, Donal Fox, Kenneth Frazelle, Gordon Green, David Kechley, Ned Rorem, Andersen Viana and 1996 Pulitzer Prize winner George Walker. Moyer commissioned Walker's Piano Sonata No. 4 and presented it in its first recording in 1986.

Discography
On JRI Recordings
 J145 - Mendelssohn & Mussorgsky
 J143 - Beethoven: Complete Works for Cello and Piano with Nancy Green, Cello
 J140 - Rachmaninoff, Addinsell, Saint-Saens
 J124 - Tribute with Peter Tillotson, Bass and Peter Fraenkel, Drums
 J122 - Edward MacDowell & Clara Schumann: Two Piano Concerti; Edward MacDowell: Piano Concerto No. 2 in D Minor, Op. 23, with the Plovdiv Philharmonic Orchestra (Plovdiv, Bulgaria), Nayden Todorov, Conductor (Used with permission from Music Minus One); Clara Schumann: Piano Concerto in A Minor, Op. 7, MIDI orchestra created by Dan Kury, William Rounds, Solo Cello
 J121 - Vienna Revisited
 J120 - Cello Works of Arensky and Rachmaninoff, with Nancy Green, Cello
 J117 - Brahms/Piatti, Hungarian Dances, with Nancy Green, Cello
 J116 - Franz Schubert: Die Schöne Müllerin, with Benjamin Luxon, Baritone
 J114 - Richard Strauss - Enoch Arden, with Benjamin Luxon, Speaker
 J113 - Chopin
 J111 - Johannes Brahms - Two Sonatas for Piano and Cello, with Nancy Green, Cello
 J109 - American Journeys with the London Symphony Orchestra, Gisèle Ben-Dor, Conductor, Christine Michelle Smith, Flutist
 J108 - Camargo Guarnieri - The Twenty Estudos
 J107 - Rhapsody in Blue and other works
 J106 - Rachmaninoff Piano Works
 J105 - Frederick Moyer in Performance
 J104 - Of Old and New: A grandfather's tale
 J103 - Beethoven Piano Sonatas
 J102 - Green/Moyer Cello Recital, with Nancy Green, Cello
 J101 - Preludes, Fugues and Variations

Technology
Moyer is the first pianist to make a commercial recording using the Bosendorfer 290 SE Recording Piano. His CD of Clara Schumann's Piano Concerto was the first commercial recording of a large-scale Romantic work using an orchestra created from sampled sounds. He has written many software programs to aid with practicing, analyzing, recording and performing music. (3) He has also designed software that helps a live soloist to stay synchronized with a recorded accompaniment.

Moyer has three patents to his name, including two for the MoyerCam, a unique projection of the keyboard and pianist's hands on the underside of the piano lid, and one for an environmentally friendly, sturdy and elegant CD Book on which he sells his recordings.

Projects

Robert Schumann Fourth Piano Sonata 
With the collaboration of electrical engineer and uncle Dr. Paul Green, Moyer unearthed the unfinished manuscript of a Fourth Piano Sonata by composer Robert Schumann. They have created a performable edition of the work, as well as “a very impressive download application that lets you follow, on the same page, both Schumann's original and the newly printed version, while listening to Moyer play the music (each measure is highlighted in sync with the playing).”

Fred Moyer Jazz Trio 
What can safely be called the only jazz group of its kind, the Fred Moyer Jazz Trio performs both its own improvisations and its note-for-note transcriptions of jazz trio performances of historic piano giants. Fred (along with the many bassists and drummers he collaborates with) create a score by transcribing every note of a favorite jazz performance, and then approach the score just as they would a chamber music work of Beethoven and Mozart, not changing the notes and staying true to the style, but interpreting the music in his own way. Fred Moyer has released two CDs with his jazz trio, and has worked with Hal Leonard Publications, releasing two books containing his transcriptions of jazz performances by Vince Guaraldi, Oscar Peterson, Erroll Garner, Horace Silver, Bill Evans, and others . These collections include a play-along CD.

Moyer's Response to COVID-19
During the COVID-19 pandemic and lockdown, Moyer has created over 60 video concerts for retirement communities across the United States, with personal touches and a conversational tone that make each concert unique to each venue. These concerts combine Moyer's musical prowess and technological innovation with use of the MoyerCam, pre-recorded professional orchestral accompaniment, and a variety of musical styles.

References

External links 
 Official site
 Facebook page

1957 births
Living people
American classical pianists
Male classical pianists
American male pianists
American musicologists
People from Waltham, Massachusetts
Curtis Institute of Music alumni
Indiana University alumni
20th-century American pianists
Classical musicians from Massachusetts
21st-century classical pianists
20th-century American male musicians
21st-century American male musicians
21st-century American pianists